Come to My Kingdom is the sixth studio album by House of Lords, released on March 17, 2008 in Europe and October 7, 2008 in the US.

The album features the same lineup as the previous album World Upside Down and was produced by singer James Christian and Jeff Kent who also co-wrote most all of the album's vocal melodies and lyrics.

Track listing

Personnel
James Christian - lead vocals, keyboards
Jimi Bell - guitar
Chris McCarvill - bass, backing vocals
B.J. Zampa - drums, percussion

Additional musicians
Robin Beck - backing vocals
Jeff Kent - All instruments and production on "Purgatorio Overture No. 2", lyrics, vocal melodies and lead vocal phrasing on all tracks except "Your Every Move"

2008 albums
House of Lords (band) albums
Frontiers Records albums